Westfield is a small village of around 180 houses located in the parish of Torphichen in West Lothian, Scotland.

References

External links

West Lothian On Demand - Westfield Paper Mill Collected Memories with video.

Villages in West Lothian